Fort Armstrong may refer to:

Places
South Africa
 Fort Armstrong, Eastern Cape along the Kat river
United States
 Fort Armstrong (Alabama)
 Fort Armstrong (Hawaii)
 Fort Armstrong (Illinois)
 Fort Armstrong Theatre
 Fort Armstrong Hotel